The Paint Research Association is a research institute, formerly in Teddington, south-west London, and now in Melton Mowbray, Leicestershire. It is now known as the PRA.

History
It was established as the Research Association of British Paint, Colour and Varnish Manufacturers in 1926; in 1971 it changed its name to the Paint Research Association. Historically, the main paint manufacturer in the UK has been ICI, under the trade name of Dulux.

Its first main research institute building opened in 1936. In 2005 it moved to the Coatings Technology Centre. In 2015 it moved to Melton.

Function
It carried out research for the government and for industry. It claims to be a world authority on paint and surface coatings.

References

External links
 PRA

1926 establishments in the United Kingdom
Chemical industry in the United Kingdom
Chemical research institutes
Borough of Melton
Paint and coatings industry
Research institutes established in 1926
Research institutes in Leicestershire
Research institutes in London